The Bellew, later Grattan-Bellew Baronetcy, of Mount Bellew in County Galway, is a title in the Baronetage of the United Kingdom. It was created on 15 August 1838 for Michael Bellew. He was a descendant of Christopher Bellew, brother of Sir Patrick Bellew, 1st Baronet (see Baron Bellew for further history of this branch of the family). Thomas Bellew, younger son of the first Baronet, sat as member of parliament for County Galway. He married Pauline, daughter of Henry Grattan. Their son, the third Baronet, assumed by Royal licence the additional surname of Grattan. As of 2022 the title is held by the latter's great-grandson, the sixth Baronet, who succeeded his father in that year. The fifth baronet was a journalist, radio and television broadcaster and publisher.

Bellew, later Grattan-Bellew baronets, of Mount Bellew (1838)

Sir Michael Dillon Bellew, 1st Baronet (1796–1855)
Sir Christopher Bellew, 2nd Baronet (1818–1867)
Sir Henry Christopher Grattan-Bellew, 3rd Baronet KHS (1860–1942)
Sir Charles Christopher Grattan-Bellew, 4th Baronet, MC (1887–1948)
Sir Henry Charles Grattan-Bellew, 5th Baronet (1933–2022)
Sir Patrick Charles Grattan-Bellew, 6th Baronet (born 1971)

The heir presumptive is the present holder's cousin Charles Henry Mordaunt Grattan-Bellew (born 1964).

Sir Henry Grattan-Bellew and his wife Naomi lived in Knowlton, Quebec, Canada on a farm in ~1956, then moved to Bulawayo, Rhodesia (now Zimbabwe).

See also
Baron Bellew
Baron Bellew of Duleek

Notes

References
Kidd, Charles, Williamson, David (editors). Debrett's Peerage and Baronetage (1990 edition). New York: St Martin's Press, 1990, 

Grattan-Bellew